"Skybox" (stylized in all caps) is a single by American rapper Gunna, released on March 6, 2020 along with the music video. It is the lead single from his second studio album Wunna (2020). The song was produced by Taurus.

Music video 
The music video was directed by Spike Jordan and opens with a claymation of Gunna on a hot air balloon floating in the clouds. It crashes after being flicked by a belly dancer. The video then switches to live-action, with Gunna lying on a field beside the deflated balloon. He wakes up and walks to a Moroccan village nearby, wandering in its streets and then partying with the locals.

Charts

Certifications

References 

2020 singles
2020 songs
Gunna (rapper) songs
Songs written by Gunna (rapper)
300 Entertainment singles